"See Me" is a single by Melanie Blatt written for the Robots movie. It peaked at #78 in the UK charts. The single was not released on the Robots soundtrack (making it a non-album single from Blatt), but used during the end credits of the UK release of the film.

Music video
The video of the single includes footage from Robots that intercut to scenes of Melanie, on a black background, dressed in different outfits, including a white suit with the left side of herself covered in silver diamonds, shown on the cover. She can also be seen singing in a ball chair or on a bed as scenes from the movie play within the surfaces.

Track list

Song information

Charts

References

External links
 Official Melanie Blatt site
 Melanie Blatt - Love Sweet Love fan site

2005 singles
Melanie Blatt songs
2005 songs
Songs written by Stuart Zender
Industrial rock songs